The 1st constituency of Allier is a French legislative constituency located in north east Allier département.  It takes in the town of Moulins, and has an estimated total population of 77,746.

Members elected

Election results

2022

 
 
 
 
 
 
|-
| colspan="8" bgcolor="#E9E9E9"|
|-
 
 

 
 
 
 
 

* Jean Mallot stood as a dissident member of the Socialist Party, which is part of the NUPES alliance. Therefore, the 2017 PS result is included in the NUPES total for swing calculations. Mallot's swing is calculated against his own result from 2017.

2017

2012

|- style="background-color:#E9E9E9;text-align:center;"
! colspan="2" rowspan="2" style="text-align:left;" | Candidate
! rowspan="2" colspan="2" style="text-align:left;" | Party
! colspan="2" | 1st round
! colspan="2" | 2nd round
|- style="background-color:#E9E9E9;text-align:center;"
! width="75" | Votes
! width="30" | %
! width="75" | Votes
! width="30" | %
|-
| style="background-color:" |
| style="text-align:left;" | Guy Chambefort
| style="text-align:left;" | Socialist Party
| PS
| 
| 38.17%
| 
| 57.62%
|-
| style="background-color:" |
| style="text-align:left;" | Pierre-André Perissol
| style="text-align:left;" | Union for a Popular Movement
| UMP
| 
| 33.36%
| 
| 42.38%
|-
| style="background-color:" |
| style="text-align:left;" | Marie-Françoise Lacarin
| style="text-align:left;" | Left Front
| FG
| 
| 14.67%
| colspan="2" style="text-align:left;" | 
|-
| style="background-color:" |
| style="text-align:left;" | Yves Lecrique
| style="text-align:left;" | National Front
| FN
| 
| 9.67%
| colspan="2" style="text-align:left;" | 
|-
| style="background-color:" |
| style="text-align:left;" | Gérard Matichard
| style="text-align:left;" | Europe Ecology – The Greens
| EELV
| 
| 2.36%
| colspan="2" style="text-align:left;" | 
|-
| style="background-color:" |
| style="text-align:left;" | Gérard Guillaumin
| style="text-align:left;" | Europe Ecology – The Greens
| EELV
| 
| 0.99%
| colspan="2" style="text-align:left;" | 
|-
| style="background-color:" |
| style="text-align:left;" | Bernard Lebel
| style="text-align:left;" | Far Left
| ExG
| 
| 0.78%
| colspan="2" style="text-align:left;" | 
|-
| colspan="8" style="background-color:#E9E9E9;"|
|- style="font-weight:bold"
| colspan="4" style="text-align:left;" | Total
| 
| 100%
| 
| 100%
|-
| colspan="8" style="background-color:#E9E9E9;"|
|-
| colspan="4" style="text-align:left;" | Registered voters
| 
| style="background-color:#E9E9E9;"|
| 
| style="background-color:#E9E9E9;"|
|-
| colspan="4" style="text-align:left;" | Blank/Void ballots
| 
| 1.17%
| 
| 2.25%
|-
| colspan="4" style="text-align:left;" | Turnout
| 
| 61.91%
| 
| 62.21%
|-
| colspan="4" style="text-align:left;" | Abstentions
| 
| 38.09%
| 
| 37.79%
|-
| colspan="8" style="background-color:#E9E9E9;"|
|- style="font-weight:bold"
| colspan="6" style="text-align:left;" | Result
| colspan="2" style="background-color:" | PS gain
|}

2007

|- style="background-color:#E9E9E9;text-align:center;"
! colspan="2" rowspan="2" style="text-align:left;" | Candidate
! rowspan="2" colspan="2" style="text-align:left;" | Party
! colspan="2" | 1st round
! colspan="2" | 2nd round
|- style="background-color:#E9E9E9;text-align:center;"
! width="75" | Votes
! width="30" | %
! width="75" | Votes
! width="30" | %
|-
| style="background-color:" |
| style="text-align:left;" | Guy Chamberfort
| style="text-align:left;" | Miscellaneous Left
| DVG
| 
| 30.45%
| 
| 54.53%
|-
| style="background-color:" |
| style="text-align:left;" | Pierre-André Perissol
| style="text-align:left;" | Union for a Popular Movement
| UMP
| 
| 40.41%
| 
| 45.47%
|-
| style="background-color:" |
| style="text-align:left;" | Delphine Mayrargue
| style="text-align:left;" | Socialist Party
| PS
| 
| 8.66%
| colspan="2" style="text-align:left;" |
|-
| style="background-color:" |
| style="text-align:left;" | Jacques Cabanne
| style="text-align:left;" | Communist
| COM
| 
| 6.62%
| colspan="2" style="text-align:left;" |
|-
| style="background-color:" |
| style="text-align:left;" | Danielle Demure
| style="text-align:left;" | Democratic Movement
| MoDem
| 
| 5.54%
| colspan="2" style="text-align:left;" |
|-
| style="background-color:" |
| style="text-align:left;" | Carla de Conde
| style="text-align:left;" | National Front
| FN
| 
| 2.43%
| colspan="2" style="text-align:left;" |
|-
| style="background-color:" |
| style="text-align:left;" | Gérard Matichard
| style="text-align:left;" | The Greens
| VEC
| 
| 1.33%
| colspan="2" style="text-align:left;" |
|-
| style="background-color:" |
| style="text-align:left;" | Michèle Beaunieux
| style="text-align:left;" | Far Left
| EXG
| 
| 1.29%
| colspan="2" style="text-align:left;" |
|-
| style="background-color:" |
| style="text-align:left;" | Jean-Marie Guillaumin
| style="text-align:left;" | Ecologist
| ECO
| 
| 0.81%
| colspan="2" style="text-align:left;" |
|-
| style="background-color:" |
| style="text-align:left;" | Christophe Darmangeat
| style="text-align:left;" | Far Left
| EXG
| 
| 0.74%
| colspan="2" style="text-align:left;" |
|-
| style="background-color:" |
| style="text-align:left;" | Michelle Miallet
| style="text-align:left;" | Movement for France
| MPF
| 
| 0.56%
| colspan="2" style="text-align:left;" |
|-
| style="background-color:" |
| style="text-align:left;" | Hugues Auvray
| style="text-align:left;" | Divers
| DIV
| 
| 0.45%
| colspan="2" style="text-align:left;" |
|-
| style="background-color:" |
| style="text-align:left;" | Judith Genot
| style="text-align:left;" | Divers
| DIV
| 
| 0.36%
| colspan="2" style="text-align:left;" |
|-
| style="background-color:" |
| style="text-align:left;" | Serge Deville
| style="text-align:left;" | Far Right
| EXD
| 
| 0.32%
| colspan="2" style="text-align:left;" |
|-
| style="background-color:" |
| style="text-align:left;" | Suzanne Corgie
| style="text-align:left;" | Divers
| DIV
| 
| 0.01%
| colspan="2" style="text-align:left;" |
|-
| colspan="8" style="background-color:#E9E9E9;"|
|- style="font-weight:bold"
| colspan="4" style="text-align:left;" | Total
| 
| 100%
| 
| 100%
|-
| colspan="8" style="background-color:#E9E9E9;"|
|-
| colspan="4" style="text-align:left;" | Registered voters
| 
| style="background-color:#E9E9E9;"|
| 
| style="background-color:#E9E9E9;"|
|-
| colspan="4" style="text-align:left;" | Blank/Void ballots
| 
| 2.20%
| 
| 2.76%
|-
| colspan="4" style="text-align:left;" | Turnout
| 
| 63.21%
| 
| 67.05%
|-
| colspan="4" style="text-align:left;" | Abstentions
| 
| 36.79%
| 
| 32.95%
|-
| colspan="8" style="background-color:#E9E9E9;"|
|- style="font-weight:bold"
| colspan="6" style="text-align:left;" | Result
| colspan="2" style="background-color:" | DVG GAIN
|}

2002

 
 
 
 
|-
| colspan="8" bgcolor="#E9E9E9"|
|-

1997

Sources

 Official results of French elections from 1998: 

1